Tartown, formerly an unincorporated community, is now an extinct community in Adams County, Pennsylvania, United States. The remains of Tartown are located on property of the Waynesboro, Pennsylvania, Borough Authority  and in the adjacent Michaux State Forest in Hamiltonban Township. The locale has in part been inundated by the reservoir created by the Waynesboro Dam on the East Branch of the Antietam Creek. The name reportedly originates from the local production of pine tar. Wagamansville is a variant name.

References

Ghost towns in Pennsylvania
Geography of Adams County, Pennsylvania